The C Line (formerly the Green Line from 1995 to 2020) is a  light rail line running between Redondo Beach and Norwalk within Los Angeles County. It is one of seven lines forming the Los Angeles Metro Rail system and opened on August 12, 1995. Along the route, the line serves the cities of Downey, El Segundo, Hawthorne, Norwalk and Lynwood, the Los Angeles community of Westchester, and several unincorporated communities in the South Los Angeles region including Athens, Del Aire, and Willowbrook. A free shuttle bus to Los Angeles International Airport (LAX) is available at the line's Aviation/LAX station.

The fully grade-separated route (essentially a light metro) runs mainly in the median of the Century Freeway (Interstate 105) for its eastern portion and on an elevated viaduct for its western portion.

A connection between the K Line and the current C Line is currently under construction and is scheduled to enter service in 2023. The two lines will be integrated, and services realigned at that time, although the service pattern has yet to be determined.

Service description

Route 

The entire route of the C Line is grade-separated, with its tracks following the median of the Century Freeway (Interstate 105) or an elevated guideway. The line begins in the west at  station, then heads roughly north through El Segundo. At , passengers can transfer to any one of several bus lines from different operators, including LAX Shuttle Route M, which provides free service to Los Angeles International Airport. From here, the C Line heads east in the median of the Century Freeway, with a connection to the Metro J Line bus rapid transit line at the Harbor Freeway Station. It then continues to a major transfer connection at the Willowbrook/Rosa Parks station (transfer point to the A Line). Finally, the line terminates in Norwalk, just east of the 605 Freeway. A junction at Willowbrook/Rosa Parks allows trains to transfer to A Line tracks for maintenance and other non-revenue operations.

When the C Line began service in 1995, it operated with only one-car trains. As ridership increased, two-car trains were then used. Ridership on the C Line has not been as high as the A Line, although it did have higher ridership than the L Line (then known as the Gold Line) until 2013. Although all of the C Line stations in the median of the Century Freeway were built by Caltrans to accommodate three-car trains, the five Metro-built stations west of the freeway only have room for two-car trains.

The line does not serve Downtown Los Angeles. Still, passengers can reach it by connecting with the J Line busway at Harbor Freeway Station, the A Line light rail at Willowbrook/Rosa Parks station, or Metro Bus Express route  at Norwalk station.

Hours of operation 
Metro C Line trains run between approximately 3:30 am. and midnight daily, with a scheduled running time of 34 minutes from end to end. Service on Friday and Saturday nights continues until approximately 2:15 am. The C Line runs with one-car trains in the early mornings (3:35 am–5:30 am) and late evenings (9:00 pm–12:55 am).

Headways 
Trains on the C Line operate every seven to eight minutes during peak hours, Monday through Friday. They operate every 15 minutes during midday and all day on the weekends, with night service running every 20 minutes.

Speed 
The line has complete grade separation, relatively long station spacing, and a primarily straight alignment.

This is 31% faster than the Metro L Line, 38% faster than the Metro A Line, and 74% faster than the Metro E Line.

Station listing 
The C Line consists of the following 14 stations (from west to east):

Ridership

History 

In 1972, Caltrans signed a consent decree to allow construction of the fiercely opposed Century Freeway (Interstate 105), which included provisions for a transit corridor in the freeway's median as a way to help communities impacted by the new freeway.

Construction began in 1987 on the corridor as a light rail line, envisioned as a connection with the bedroom communities in the Gateway Cities along the Century Freeway with the then-burgeoning aerospace center in El Segundo. The section in El Segundo would be fully elevated and follow the route of the Harbor Subdivision.

From the beginning of the project, several compromises were made. Because Caltrans dropped a plan for the freeway to cross through Norwalk to Interstate 5, the line was denied a connection to the then-new  Metrolink station. Additionally, although planners planned to add a spur to LAX, they did not include it in the initial project over fears that commuters would not use the line if they had to go through the airport on the way to work. The proposed extension to LAX was further complicated by concerns from the Federal Aviation Administration that the overhead lines of the rail line would interfere with the landing paths of airplanes. Amid ambivalence at LAX and L.A. City Hall, the plans to extend the line to the airport were shelved.

The line opened on August 12, 1995, more than a year late and $950 million over budget. By that time, the Cold War was over, and the aerospace sector in El Segundo was hemorrhaging jobs. The collapse of jobs in the area and the compromises made during construction limited the line's utility, earning it the nickname "the train to nowhere."

One of the lessons learned from the line, and the Harbor Transitway built at the same time, was that freeway median stations offer a poor rider experience, requiring customers to descend from bridges or climb stairs from dimly lit underpasses to isolated stations in the middle of a noisy and exhaust-ridden freeway. While stations generally have elevators as a necessary ADA accommodation, these sometimes fail, and have been known for having sanitation issues; escalators are also often out for maintenance or, with the C Line in particular, only available downward. 

Over time, the line did find riders, and ridership grew steadily, peaking at nearly 13 million riders in 2014, driven by the 5,100 park-and-ride spaces and slowing traffic on the 105 freeway.

Future

Integration with the K Line

Varying service patterns have been proposed for integrating the completed K Line into the rest of the system throughout its planning and construction, all of which have involved sharing trackage and infrastructure facilities with the existing C Line. Although some early proposals would've sent trains through all three directions of the wye that will connect the existing C Line with the new segment, this was rejected by Metro because it would cause too much wear and tear on the track switch mechanisms.

The debate over service patterns proved somewhat contentious, as the final pattern must balance the needs of riders, operational needs, and the political constituencies of Metro's board members. In 2018, with the line then scheduled to open within the year, the Metro Board of Directors overrode a recommendation by operations staff that would've had a single line operating between Expo/Crenshaw and Norwalk station. Passengers from the Redondo Beach area would have been served by a shuttle to the LAX area, where they would need to transfer to another train to continue east or north. Instead, board members approved a one-year pilot of a configuration that would combine an Expo-to-Norwalk line with another line that would connect Redondo Beach with Willowbrook/Rosa Parks station, allowing transfers to the A and J Lines.  The approved plan would incur higher operating expenses, but board members argued it would retain better transfer opportunities for South Bay residents.

Ongoing construction delays led to a reassessment of that plan in 2022. Metro recommended public outreach to reformulate the operating plan before the connection to the C Line opens in 2023.

Southern Extension to South Bay 

Metro is currently working on the initial environmental study of a corridor extension of the C Line from its Redondo terminus toward the southeast. The Green Line Extension to Torrance would roughly follow the Harbor Subdivision ROW into the South Bay, to the Torrance Regional Transit Center (RTC).
Metro and the public are considering two alternatives in the DEIR: an elevated light-rail extension, and an at-grade extension over existing tracks, with vehicle type still to be determined. The study of the South Bay Extension will lead to the publication of a Draft Environmental Impact Report (DEIR). The study was expected to be completed in 2011. The project was placed on hold in the Spring of 2012 due to uncertain funding. With the passage of Measure M in 2016, $619 million was cited for the Green Line Extension south, and the study resumed, which is currently scheduled for release in mid-2020 release. The study area includes the former Harbor Subdivisions right of way. The extension study includes the Redondo Beach station to the Torrance Transit Center, a  extension study area.

According to the LA County Expenditure Plan (Measure M), groundbreaking for the project is scheduled for 2026, with an expected opening in 2030–2033. The timeline is expected to be accelerated under the Twenty-eight by '28 initiative.

Eastern Extension to Norwalk/Santa Fe Springs station 

Norwalk/Santa Fe Springs is also a proposed station on the California High-Speed Rail project. Bus service, primarily via Norwalk Transit line 4, is provided between the Metrolink station and the C Line terminus. Still, schedules are not coordinated with the C Line's arrivals. While plans exist to close the gap, available Measure M funding allows the operation to start in roughly 2052.

Operations

Maintenance facilities 
The C Line is operated out of Division 22 (Hawthorne Yard & Shop) and Division 16 (Southwestern Yard). These yards stores the fleet used on the C line. Light maintenance is done on the fleet in Division 22, and heavier maintenance is done in Division 16. Division 22 is located between Redondo Beach and Douglas stations. Trains enter the yard via a junction halfway between the two stations. Norwalk-bound trains (Northbound) may enter, but no exit track exists to continue north. Redondo Beach-bound trains (Southbound) may enter and exit the Yard to continue south.

Rolling stock 
At the time the Green Line opened, the line used a fleet of Nippon Sharyo P2020 light rail vehicles, which were very similar to the older Nippon Sharyo P865 vehicles used on the Blue Line. In late 2001, the P2020 fleet was transferred to the Blue Line, and the Green Line received new Siemens P2000 railcars that have been operating on the line ever since. Kinki Sharyo P3010 trains are also used. Trains are limited to two-car sets due to platform length limitations at some stations along the line.

Incidents 
 On February 22, 2015, a train near the Hawthorne/Lennox station struck and killed a man who was trespassing onto the tracks.
 On August 24, 2018, a collision involving a tanker truck on the westbound lanes of the I-105 between Vermont Avenue and Crenshaw Boulevard exploded with flames that crawled onto the tracks and damaged the catenary system. The rail line and the freeway were closed for cleanup and repairs.

References

External links 

 MTA Home Page
 Green Line Home Page
 Green Line connections overview
 Green Line schedule

C Line (Los Angeles Metro)
Los Angeles County Metro Rail
Light rail in California
Public transportation in Los Angeles
Public transportation in Los Angeles County, California
Railway lines opened in 1995
Railway lines in highway medians
1995 establishments in California